Scott Malolua (born 11 June 1993 in Samoa) is a Samoan rugby union player who plays for the Queensland Reds in Super Rugby. His playing position is scrum-half. He was named in the Reds squad for week 15 in 2019.

He gave up his rugby career in 2018 to focus on his career as a carpenter.

He was selected for the Samoa national rugby union team for the 2019 Rugby World Cup. He made his international debut in a match against Australia, but suffered a shoulder injury which ruled him out for the world cup.

Reference list

External links
Rugby.com.au profile
itsrugby.co.uk profile

1993 births
Samoan rugby union players
Living people
Rugby union scrum-halves
Samoa international rugby union players
Queensland Country (NRC team) players
Queensland Reds players